Choi Kwang-ryul (born May 23, 1994), known by the stage name Kanto, is a South Korean rapper and composer. He debuted as a soloist with his debut single, What You Want, on October 25, 2013. He later debuted as a member of South Korean hip hop and R&B quartet Troy in September 2014. He released his first EP, 14216, on September 27, 2016.

Discography

Extended plays

Singles

Filmography

Television
 Show Me The Money 2 (Mnet, 2013)
 The Unit (KBS2, 2017–2018)
 Show Me the Money 10 (Mnet, 2021)

Notes

References

1994 births
Living people
South Korean male rappers
South Korean hip hop singers
21st-century South Korean male  singers
Brand New Music artists
South_Korean_male_idols